Live Vol. 1 may refer to:
 Live Vol. 1 (Ziggy Marley and the Melody Makers album), 2000
 Live Vol. 1 (Gnags album), 1981
 Live! Volume One, a 2002 album by The O.C. Supertones